Till the End is the third studio album by American metalcore band Phinehas. The album was released on July 10, 2015, through Artery Recordings and is the band's first release through the label. The album debuted at no. 2 on the Billboard Top Christian Albums chart.

Background and promotion
At the end of 2014, Phinehas announced they would begin working on their third studio album after concluding their tour for The Last Word Is Yours to Speak. On February 17, 2015, the band announced they had signed to Artery Recordings after their previous label, Red Cord Records, dissolved into Victory Records. On May 4, Phinehas released the first single "Dead Choir" and announced the album itself along with the release date. On June 9, the band released the live music video for the song "Tetelestai". On July 13, three days after the album's release, the band unveiled a music video for the third single, "White Livered".

Track listing

Personnel
Phinehas
 Sean McCulloch – lead vocals
 Daniel Gailey – guitars, backing vocals
 Bryce Kelley – bass, backing vocals
 Lee Humerian – drums, backing vocals

Additional musicians
 Dominic Dickinson of Affiance – guest guitar on track 2

Charts

References

2015 albums
Phinehas (band) albums
Artery Recordings albums